For information on all Lamar University sports, see Lamar Cardinals and Lady Cardinals

The 2019–20 Lamar Lady Cardinals basketball team represented Lamar University during the 2019–20 NCAA Division I women's basketball season. The Lady Cardinals, led by first year head coach Aqua Franklin, played their home games at the Montagne Center as members of the Southland Conference. They finished the season 10–19, 6–14 in Southland play to finish in tenth place. They failed to qualify for the Southland women's tournament, which would eventually be cancelled due to the coronavirus pandemic.

Previous season
The Lady Cardinals finished the 2018–19 season with an overall record of 24–7. They won the Southland Conference regular season championship were 17–1 in Southland play.  After losing to Abilene Christian in the Southland Conference tournament semi-final game 79–88, the Lady Cardinals were an automatic qualifier to the WNIT.  Their season ended with a first round 71–73 loss to the South Alabama in the first round.  The loss ended a 42 home court win streak which started on November 16, 2016.  Chastadie Barrs set the NCAA Division I steals record in the WNIT game at 192.  She had tied the steals record of 191 the previous season.

Roster

Schedule 
Sources:

|-
!colspan=12 style=""| Exhibition schedule

|-
!colspan=12 style=""| Non-Conference schedule

|-
!colspan=12 style="" | Conference schedule

See also 
2019–20 Lamar Cardinals basketball team

References 

Lamar Lady Cardinals basketball seasons
Lamar
Lamar Lady Cardinals basketball
Lamar Lady Cardinals basketball